The term Seawaymax refers to vessels which are the maximum size that can fit through the canal locks of the St. Lawrence Seaway, linking the inland Great Lakes of North America with the Atlantic Ocean.

A number of lake freighters larger than this size cruise the Great Lakes and cannot pass through to the Atlantic Ocean. The size of the locks limits the size of the ships which can pass and so limits the size of the cargoes they can carry. The record tonnage for one vessel on the Seaway is 28,502 tons of iron ore while the record through the larger locks of the Great Lakes Waterway is 72,351 tons. Most new lake vessels, however, are constructed to the Seawaymax limit to enhance versatility by allowing the possibility of off-Lakes use.

See also

 Canso Canal, a Seawaymax passage in Nova Scotia
 SS Edmund Fitzgerald, the first ship constructed close to Seawaymax size
 Cargo ship#Size categories
 Official Seaway Handbook

References

External links 
Ship sizes

Ship types
Saint Lawrence Seaway
Ship measurements
+